Sandi Ćoralić (born 12 February 1998) is a Slovenian professional footballer who plays as a left-back for Brinje Grosuplje.

Career
Ćoralić made his professional Slovenian PrvaLiga debut for Rudar Velenje on 26 August 2017 against Gorica. He came on to the pitch in the 43rd minute to replace Anže Pišek.

In February 2022, Ćoralić signed with Pohronie of Slovak Super Liga, where he was to play as a preferred left-back. Prior to the re-start of the season, he suffered an injury and the club had signed Milan Šimčák as a result. While Ćoralić recovered before the end of the season, he failed to appear for the team, only appearing three times for the farm team of Nová Baňa in 3. Liga, before departing in the summer.

References

External links
 
 Sandi Ćoralić at NZS 

1998 births
Living people
Slovenian footballers
Association football fullbacks
Slovenia youth international footballers
NK Olimpija Ljubljana (2005) players
NK Rudar Velenje players
NK Brda players
NK Fužinar players
FK Pohronie players
Slovenian PrvaLiga players
Slovenian Second League players
3. Liga (Slovakia) players
Slovenian expatriate footballers
Slovenian expatriate sportspeople in Slovakia
Expatriate footballers in Slovakia